Magnus Vigrestad (12 August 1887 – 1 December 1957) was a Norwegian sculptor. Among his works is a sculpture of the novelist Alexander Kielland from 1927. He is represented in the National Gallery of Norway. He has also modeled the bronze statuette for the sports prize Egebergs Ærespris.

References

1887 births
1957 deaths
People from Stavanger
Norwegian sculptors
20th-century sculptors